Opportunity is a robotic rover that was active on the planet Mars from 2004 to 2018.  Launched on July 7, 2003, Opportunity landed on Mars' Meridiani Planum on January 25, 2004, at 05:05 Ground UTC (about 13:15 Mars local time), three weeks after its twin Spirit (MER-A), also part of NASA's Mars Exploration Rover Mission, touched down on the other side of the planet. While Spirit became immobile in 2009 and ceased communications in 2010, Opportunity exceeded its planned 90 sol (Martian days) duration of activity by 14 years 46 days (in Earth time). Opportunity continued to move, gather scientific observations, and report back to Earth until 2018. What follows is a summary of events during its continuing mission.

Opportunity started in Eagle crater in 2004, literally landing inside on the crater basin, then it travelled outward making its way to Endurance crater. After this it went to Victoria crater, all the way making many panoramas, measurements, studying rocks and smaller craters, even what are thought to be meteorites. It then traveled to Endeavour crater, where it has been making its way south along the Western rim. On June 10, 2018, contact was lost when a global dust storm blotted out the Sun, thus depriving the rover of enough power for operations and communication with Earth. In September 2018, after the storm subsided, NASA began making various efforts to contact and listen to the rover if it endured the storm. NASA officials declared that the Opportunity mission was complete on February 13, 2019, after it failed to wake from over 1,000 repeated signals sent since August 2018.

Mission timeline

Summary

Landing site context

2004

Landing site: "Eagle" crater 

NASA Scientists were so excited about landing in a crater that they called the landing a "hole in one"; however, they were not aiming for the crater (and did not know it existed). Later, the crater was named Eagle crater and the landing site designated "Challenger Memorial Station". This was the darkest landing site ever visited by a spacecraft on Mars. It would be two weeks before Opportunity was able to get a better look at its surroundings.

Scientists were intrigued by the abundance of rock outcrops dispersed throughout the crater, as well as the crater's soil, which appeared to be a mixture of coarse gray grains and fine reddish grains. This sweeping look at the unusual rock outcropping near Opportunity was captured by the rover's panoramic camera. Scientists believe the seemingly layered rocks are either volcanic ash deposits or sediments laid down by wind or water. It was given the name Opportunity Ledge.

Geologists said that the layers—some no thicker than a finger—indicate the rocks likely originated either from sediments carried by water or wind, or from falling volcanic ash. "We should be able to distinguish between those two hypotheses", said Dr. Andrew Knoll of Harvard University, Cambridge, a member of the science team for Opportunity and its twin, Spirit. If the rocks are sedimentary, water is a more likely source than wind, he said.

The layers are very thin measuring just a few millimeters thick in some cases.

"Opportunity Ledge" outcroppings 

On Sol 15, Opportunity took a close up of the rock "Stone Mountain" in the outcrop area of the crater, raising speculation that the rock consisted of very fine grain or dust, in contrast to Earth sandstone, which is compacted sand with rather large grains. The weathering agent eroding away layers of this rock seemed to be visible as dark spots.

A picture received on February 10 (taken on Sol 16) showed that the thin layers in the bedrock converge and diverge at low angles, suggesting that some "moving current" such as volcanic flow, wind, or water formed these rocks. The discovery of these layers was significant for scientists who had planned this mission to test the "water hypothesis" rigorously.

El Capitan outcropping 

On February 19 the survey of "Opportunity Ledge" was declared successful. A specific target in the outcrop (dubbed "El Capitan"), whose upper and lower portions appeared to differ in layering and weathering characteristics, was selected for further investigation. Opportunity reached El Capitan on Sol 27, and took a first picture of the rocks with its panoramic camera.

On Sol 30, Opportunity used its Rock Abrasion Tool (RAT) for the first time to investigate the rocks around El Capitan. The image on the right-hand side shows a close-up view taken after the drilling and cleaning process was complete. Due to chance, two spherules were also cut partially, and seem to show scratches and other marks made by the diamond-crusted grind tool. The black areas are artifacts of the imaging process, when parts of the picture are missing.

During a press conference on   March 2, 2004, mission scientists discussed their conclusions about the bedrock and the evidence for the presence of liquid water during their formation. They presented the following reasoning to explain the small, elongated voids in the rock visible on the surface and after grinding into it (see last two images below).

These voids are consistent with features known to geologists as "vugs". These are formed when crystals form inside a rock matrix and are later removed through erosive processes, leaving behind voids. Some of the features in this picture are "disk-like", which is consistent with certain types of crystals, notably sulfate minerals.

Additionally, mission members presented first data from the MIMOS II Mössbauer spectrometer taken at the bedrock site. The iron spectrum obtained from the rock El Capitan shows strong evidence for the mineral jarosite. This mineral contains hydroxide ions, which indicates the presence of water when the minerals were formed. Mini-TES data from the same rock showed that it consists of a considerable amount of sulfates.

Analyzing soil through digging a trench 

In order to analyze the soil inside the crater it was decided to try to dig a trench with the wheels. The rover alternately pushed soil forward and backward out of the trench with its right front wheel while other wheels held the rover in place. The rover turned slightly between bouts of digging to widen the hole. The process lasted 22 minutes.
Two features that caught scientists' attention were the clotty texture of soil in the upper wall of the trench and the brightness of soil on the trench floor.

By inspecting the sides and floor of a hole it dug, Opportunity found some things it had not imaged beforehand, including shiny round pebbles and soil so fine-grained that the rover's microscope could not make out individual particles.

What is underneath is different from what is at the immediate surface. The soils consist of fine-grained basaltic sand and a surface lag of hematite-rich spherules, spherule fragments, and other granules. Underlying the thin soil layer, are flat-lying sedimentary rocks. These rocks are finely laminated, are rich in sulfur, and contain abundant sulfate salts.

Endurance crater 

On sol   April 20, 2004, the rover reached Endurance crater, which was known to have many layers of rocks.  In May the rover circumnavigated the crater, and made observations with Mini-TES and the panoramic camera. The rock "Lion Stone" was investigated on Sol 107 and found to be similar in composition to the layers found in Eagle crater.

On sol   June 4, 2004 mission members announced their intention to drive Opportunity into Endurance, even if it should turn out to be impossible to get back out, targeting the various rock layers that were identified in the pictures from the crater rim. "This is a crucial and careful decision for the Mars Exploration Rovers' extended mission", said Dr. Edward Weiler, NASA's associate administrator for space science. Steve Squyres, principal investigator from Cornell University said: "Answering the question of what came before the evaporites is the most significant scientific issue we can address with Opportunity at this time."

A first drive into the crater was executed on sol  June 8, and Opportunity backed out again the same day. 
It was found that the angle of the surface was well inside the safety margin (about 18 degrees), and the full excursion toward the rock layer of interest was started. During Sols 134 (June 12), 135, and 137 the rover drove deeper and deeper into the crater. Although some wheel slip was observed, driving was discovered to be possible even at slope angles up to 30 degrees.

Wispy clouds, similar to Earth's cirrus clouds, were spotted.

Opportunity spent roughly 180 sols inside the crater, before backing out of it again in mid December 2004, on Sol 315. Scientific results of the sedimentary geology of the crater were published in the journal Earth and Planetary Science Letters  In December 2004, daily power output varied from 840 watt-hours while inside Endurance Crater to 730 watt-hours on the plains.

2005

Heat Shield Rock and stuck in sand 

After exiting Endurance crater, in January 2005 Opportunity was driven to examine its own discarded heat shield. While in the vicinity of the heat shield, on Sol 345 it came upon an object that was immediately suspected and soon confirmed to be a meteorite. The meteorite was promptly named Heat Shield Rock, and is the first meteorite identified on another planet (although the Bench Crater and Hadley Rille meteorites were found earlier on the Moon).

The rover was commanded to dig another trench on the vast plains of Meridiani Planum, on Sol 366, and observations continued until Sol 373 (February 10, 2005). The rover then passed the craters "Alvin" and "Jason", and by Sol 387, approached a "crater triplet" on its way to Vostok Crater. Along the way, Opportunity set a distance record for one-day travel by either rover: , on sol   February 19, 2005. On Sol   (February 26, 2005), the rover approached one of the three craters, dubbed Naturaliste. A rock target named "Normandy" was chosen for investigation on Sol 392, and Opportunity remained there until Sol 395.

Opportunity reached Vostok Crater on Sol 399, finding it mostly filled with sand and lined by outcrops. It was then ordered south into what has been called "etched terrain", to search for more bedrock.

On March 20, 2005 (Sol 410) Opportunity set a new Martian record for the longest single day drive when it drove .

By Sol 415, Opportunity stopped by some soil ripples to investigate the differences between soil in the trough of a ripple and its crest. Various soil targets included "Mobarak" in the trough, named in honor of Persian New Year, and "Norooz" and "Mayberooz" on the crest. By Sol 421, the rover left the ripple for "Viking" crater.

Between April 26, 2005 (Sol 446) and June 4, 2005 (Sol 484) Opportunity was stuck in a Martian sand dune. The sand dune was designated "Purgatory Dune" by mission planners.

The rover's condition was simulated on Earth prior to any attempt to move, out of concern that the rover might become permanently immobilized. After various simulations intended to mimic the properties and behavior of Martian sand were completed, the rover executed its first wheel movements on sol  (May 13, 2005), intentionally advancing only a few centimeters, after which mission members evaluated the results.

During Sol 465 and 466 more drive commands were executed, and with each trial the rover moved another couple of centimeters. At the end of each movement, panoramic images were acquired to investigate the atmosphere and the surrounding dune field. The sand dune escape maneuver was successfully completed on sol  (June 4, 2005), and all six wheels of Opportunity were on firmer ground. After studying "Purgatory" from Sol 498 to Sol 510, Opportunity proceeded southward toward "Erebus crater".

Erebus crater 
Opportunity  studied Erebus crater, a large, shallow, partially buried crater and a stopover on the way south toward Victoria crater, between October 2005 and March 2006.

New programming to measure the percentage of slip in the wheels was successful in preventing the rover from getting stuck again. Another "Purgatory"-like incident was averted on Sol 603, when onboard slip check software stopped a drive after slip reached 44.5%. It proceeded over many ripples and 'half-pipes', taking photographs after each sol's journey.

On Sol   (November 3, 2005) Opportunity woke up in the midst of a mild dust storm that lasted three days. The rover was able to drive in self-protective auto-mode during the storm, but it could not take any post-drive images. Less than three weeks later, another cleaning event cleared the dust off of the solar array so as to produce around 720 watt-hours (80% of max). On Sol  (December 1, 2005), it was discovered the motor used to stow the robotic arm for travel was stalling. This problem took nearly two weeks to fix. Initially, the arm was stowed only for travel and was extended at night to prevent the arm from getting stuck. However, further stalling convinced engineers to leave the arm extended at all times to avoid the arm becoming stuck in the stowed position and becoming unusable.

Opportunity observed numerous outcroppings around Erebus crater.

It also collaborated with ESA's Mars Express by using the miniature Thermal Emission Spectrometer and panoramic camera (Pancam), and took images of a transit across the Sun by Phobos. On Sol  (March 22, 2006), Opportunity began the journey to its next destination, Victoria crater, which it would reach in September 2006 (Sol 951). It would stay at Victoria crater until August 2008 (Sol 1630–1634).

Shoulder troubles 

The "shoulder" joint of Opportunitys arm has had troubles since Sol 2 (January 25, 2004), the rover's second day on Mars. Engineers discovered that the heater on the shoulder azimuth joint, which controls side-to-side motion of the robotic arm, was stuck in the "on" position. Closer investigation revealed that the on-off switch had probably failed during assembly, test, and launch operations on Earth. Fortunately for Opportunity, the rover was equipped with a built-in safety mechanism called a "T-stat box" (thermostatic switch) that provided protection against overheating. When the shoulder azimuth joint, also known as Joint 1, got too hot, the T-stat switch automatically opened and temporarily disabled the heater. When the joint got cold again, the T-stat closed. As a result, the heater stayed on all night but not all day.

The safety mechanism worked until Opportunity approached the first winter on Mars. As the Sun began to retreat lower in the sky and solar power levels dropped, it became clear that Opportunity would not be able to keep the batteries charged with a heater draining power all night long. On Sol  (May 28, 2004), rover operators began using a procedure known as "deep sleep," during which Opportunity disconnected the batteries at night. Deep sleep prevented the stuck heater (and everything else on the rover except the clock and the battery heaters) from drawing power. When the Sun came up the next morning and sunlight began hitting the solar arrays, the batteries automatically reconnected, the robotic arm became operational, the shoulder joint warmed up, and the thermostatic switch opened, disabling the heater. As a result, the shoulder joint was extremely hot during the day and extremely cold at night. Such huge temperature swings, which tend to make electric motors wear out faster, were taking place every sol.

This strategy worked for Opportunity until Sol 654 (November 25, 2005), when the Joint-1 azimuth motor stalled because of increased electrical resistance. Rover operators responded by delivering higher-than-normal current to the motor. This approach also worked, though Joint 1 continued to stall periodically. Typically, the rover's handlers simply tried again the next sol and the joint worked. They determined that the Joint-1 motor stalls were most likely due to damage caused by the extreme temperature cycles the joint experienced during deep sleep. As a precaution, they started keeping the robotic arm out in front of the rover overnight, rather than stowing it underneath the rover deck, where it would be virtually unusable in the event of a Joint-1 motor failure. They stowed the arm only while driving and unstowed it immediately at the end of each drive.

2006

Journey to Victoria crater 
On March 22, 2006 (Sol 760), Opportunity left Erebus crater and began the journey to Victoria crater, which it reached in September 2006 (Sol 951). It would stay at Victoria crater until August 2008 (Sol 1630–1634).

Arrival at Victoria crater 

Victoria's diameter is six times larger than Endurance crater. Scientists believed that rock outcrops along the walls of Victoria would yield more information about the geologic history of Mars, if the rover survived long enough to investigate them.

On Sol  (September 26, 2006) Opportunity reached the rim of Victoria Crater and transmitted the first substantial views of Victoria, including the dune field at the bottom of the crater. The Mars Reconnaissance Orbiter photographed Opportunity at the rim of the crater.

2007

Moving around Victoria's rim 

On January 4, 2007, both rovers received new flight software for their computers. The update was received just in time for the third anniversary of their landing. The new systems let the rovers decide whether to transmit an image, and whether to extend their arms to examine rocks, which would save much time for scientists, as they would not have to sift through hundreds of images to find the one they want, or examine the surroundings to decide to extend the arms and examine the rocks.

The APXS instrument was now for the first time used to determine the amount of the noble gas argon in the atmosphere of Mars. The same measurements were done on the other side of the planet by its rover twin Spirit. The purpose of this experiment was to determine the atmospheric mixing processes and track their changes with time.

In January the rover drove along the north side of the crater rim and imaged the cliffs from different viewpoints. While driving another meteorite was found: Santa Caterina.
In March the Valley without peril was reached. This point had thought to be a possible entry point into the crater. But it turned out that this point had a too steep slope to drive carefully downside. After two additional cliffs where inspected it was decided to drive the whole way back to the point, where Opportunity arrived at Victoria crater. On June 15, 2007, the rover arrived at Duck Bay and prepared for entering the crater.

A series of cleaning events beginning on Sol  (April 20, 2007) allowed Opportunitys solar energy production to rise to above 800 watt-hours per Sol. By Sol  (May 4, 2007) the solar array current was peaking above 4.0 amperes, values not seen since Sol  (February 10, 2004). However, the advent of extensive dust storms on Mars starting in mid-2007 (in-line with Mars' six Earth-year global dust storm cycle), dropped energy production levels to 280 watt-hours per day.

Dust storms 

Toward the end of June 2007, a series of dust storms began clouding the Martian atmosphere with dust. The storms intensified and by July 20, both Opportunity and Spirit were facing the real possibility of system failure due to lack of power. NASA released a statement to the press that said (in part) "We're rooting for our rovers to survive these storms, but they were never designed for conditions this intense". The key problem caused by the dust storm was a dramatic reduction in solar power. There was so much dust in the atmosphere that it blocked 99 percent of direct sunlight to the rover. The Spirit rover, on the other side of the planet, was getting slightly more sunlight than Opportunity.

Normally the solar arrays are able to generate about 700 watt-hours of energy per day. During the storms, the power generated is greatly reduced. If the rovers get less than 150 watt-hours per day they have to start draining their batteries. If the batteries run dry, key electrical elements are likely to fail due to the intense cold. On July 18, 2007, the rover's solar-panel only generated 128 watt-hours, the lowest level ever. NASA responded by commanding Opportunity to only communicate with Earth once every three days, the first time that this had happened since the start of the mission.

The dust storms continued through July and at the end of the month, NASA announced that the rovers, even under their very-low-power mode were barely getting enough energy to survive. If the temperature of the Opportunitys electronics module continued to drop, according to the announcement, "there is a real risk that Opportunity will trip a low-power fault. When a low-power fault is tripped, the rover's systems take the batteries off-line, putting the rover to sleep and then checking each sol to see if there is sufficient available energy to wake up and perform daily fault communications. If there is not sufficient energy, Opportunity will stay asleep. Depending on the weather conditions, Opportunity could stay asleep for days, weeks or even months, all the while trying to charge its batteries with whatever available sunlight there might be." It was quite possible that the rover would never wake up from a low-power fault.

By sol  August 7, 2007 the storms appeared to be weakening, and although power levels were still low they were sufficient for Opportunity to begin taking and returning images. By August 21 dust levels were still improving, the batteries were fully charged and Opportunity was able to make its first drive since the dust storms began.

Opportunity made a short drive into Duck Bay on sol  September 11, 2007 and then reversed out again to test traction on the initial slope into Victoria Crater. On sol   September 13, 2007 it returned
to begin a more thorough exploration of the inner slope, examining a series of layers of pale-coloured rock in the upper parts of Duck Bay and the face of the promontory Cape Verde in detail.

2008 
Rover daily power output averaged 580 watt-hours in the first days of 2008, with atmospheric opacity (tau) caused by dust at about 0.71, and solar array dust factor averaging 0.787.

Inspecting Victoria crater 
On Sol 1502 (April 15, 2008) the motor stalled at the beginning of an unstowing operation at the end of a drive, when the arm was still tucked underneath the rover. The motor continued to stall on all subsequent attempts, sol after sol. Engineers performed tests at various times of day to measure electrical resistance. They found that the resistance was lowest (essentially normal) when the joint was at its warmest—in the morning, following deep sleep, after the heater had been on for several hours, and just before the T-stat opened. They decided to try to unstow the arm one more time under these conditions.

At 08:30 local Mars time on Sol  (May 14, 2008), they allowed Opportunity to direct as much current as possible to the warm, joint-1 azimuth motor in order to get the robotic arm into a usable position, in front of the rover. It worked.

Because Opportunity will likely never again stow the robotic arm, engineers devised a strategy for driving the rover safely with the arm deployed in front.

Departing Victoria crater 

The rover exited Victoria crater's Duck Bay on August 24–28, 2008 (sol 1630–1634). Before exiting the crater the rover experienced a current spike similar to the one that preceded the malfunction of the right front wheel of its twin Spirit. After Victoria crater and during its journey to Endeavour crater the rover investigated sets of "dark cobbles" on the Meridiani plains.

Rover drivers estimated that this distance could be traversed in about two years. Scientists expected to see a much deeper stack of rock layers at the crater than those examined by Opportunity in Victoria. The discovery of phyllosilicate clay-bearing rock on the Endeavour crater rim promised exposure to a rock-type that is even more hospitable to life than types previously analyzed.

The solar conjunction, where the Sun is between Earth and Mars, started on sol  November 29, 2008 and communication with the rovers was not possible until December 13, 2008. During this time the rover team planned to have Opportunity use the Mössbauer spectrometer to examine a rock outcrop named "Santorini".

2009

Driving through Meridiani plains 
On sol  (March 7, 2009) Opportunity first saw the rim of Endeavour after driving about  since it left Victoria in August 2008.

On sol  (April 7, 2009) Opportunity generated 515 watt-hours after a cleaning event of the solar arrays increased energy production by about 40%. The drive actuator for the right front wheel, which had been rested while Opportunity studied a rock outcrop called "Penrhyn", had motor currents very close to normal levels.

More meteorite findings 
On sol  (July 18, 2009) a large dark rock was noted in the opposite direction from which Opportunity was traveling and so the rover headed toward it, reaching it on sol  (July 28).  The rock turned out to be a meteorite and was named Block Island. Opportunity spent until September 12, 2009 (Sol 2004) investigating the meteorite, before returning to its journey toward Endeavour Crater.

Its journey was interrupted on Sol 2022 by the find of another meteorite, a  specimen dubbed 'Shelter Island', which the rover investigated until Sol 2034. It then headed for another meteorite, 'Mackinac Island', which it reached four sols later on sol  (October 17, 2009). The rover conducted a drive-by imaging sequence but otherwise did not investigate this meteorite, resuming its journey to Endeavour.

On sol  (November 10, 2009) the rover reached a rock target of interest, named 'Marquette Island'.  Prolonged study until sol  January 12, 2010 ensued, as it was uncertain what type of rock this represented, but the eventual conclusion was that it was rock ejecta from deep within the surface of Mars rather than a meteorite.

2010

Concepción 

On January 28, 2010 (Sol 2138) Opportunity arrived at Concepcion crater. Opportunity successfully circumnavigated the  diameter crater before continuing on towards Endeavour. Energy production varied from about 305 watt-hours to about 270 Wh during this period.

On (May 19, 2010), Opportunity reached  sols of operation, making it the longest Mars surface mission in history, breaking the record of 2245 sols set by Viking 1.

Santa Maria crater 
In July 2010, it was announced that the Opportunity team would use the theme of names given to places visited
by British Royal Navy Captain, Lieutenant James Cook, in his 1769–1771 Pacific Ocean voyage in command of HMS Endeavour, for informal names of sites at Endeavour Crater. These would include "Cape Tribulation" and "Cape Dromedary", "Cape Byron" (the most easterly point of the Australian mainland), and "Point Hicks" (the part of the Australian mainland first sighted by the Endeavour in 1770).

On sol  (September 8, 2010), the halfway point of the  journey between Victoria crater and Endeavour crater was reached.

In November the rover spent a few days imaging a  crater called Intrepid while navigating through a field of small impact craters. On sol   November 14, 2010 total odometry passed the  mark. Average solar array energy production in October and November was about 600 watt-hours.

The results from Opportunity were compared to data taken from orbit by the CRISM instrument, a spectrometer, on the Mars Reconnaissance Orbiter. CRISM had detected water-bearing minerals at Santa Maria crater, and the rover helped further analyze this. Opportunity drove farther in that Martian year (that is about 2 Earth years), than in any previous year.

2011

Heading to Endeavour crater
After its arrival at the edge of Santa Maria crater, the team positioned the rover at its southeastern rim and collected data. They also prepared for the two-week solar conjunction of late January, when the Sun was between Earth and Mars and communication was blocked. In late March Opportunity began the  journey between Santa Maria and Endeavour, and on June 1, the rover passed the  traverse milestone (over 50 times its designed distance). Two weeks later, on sol   (July 17, 2011), Opportunity had driven  on Mars.

By sol   (August 29, 2011), Opportunity had continued to function effectively 30 times longer than its planned 90-sol mission, aided by solar cell cleaning events, and performed extensive geological analysis of Martian rocks and planetary surface features with its instruments.

Endeavour crater arrival 
Opportunity arrived at Endeavour crater on sol  (August 9, 2011), at a landmark called Spirit Point named after its rover twin, after traversing  from Victoria crater, over a three-year period. The rover's deputy principal investigator, Ray Arvidson, said it will probably not enter Endeavour crater as it appears to contain material observed previously. The rocks on the rim are older than any previously studied by Opportunity. "I think there's much more interest in driving around the perimeter of the rim," said Arvidson. The rover survived so long this goal was accomplished, and by 2016 it was decided to not only enter Endevaour crater but also explore, for the first time in history what is thought to be a water carved gully on Mars (update:2016).

Upon arriving at Endeavour, Opportunity almost immediately began discovering Martian phenomena not previously observed. On sol  (August 22, 2011) the rover began examining Tisdale 2, a large ejecta block. "This is different from any rock ever seen on Mars," said Steve Squyres, principal investigator for Opportunity at Cornell University in Ithaca, New York. "It has a composition similar to some volcanic rocks, but there's much more zinc and bromine than we've typically seen. We are getting confirmation that reaching Endeavour really has given us the equivalent of a second landing site for Opportunity." (See also Cape York (Mars))

In December the Homestake formation was analyzed, which was concluded to be formed of gypsum. Using three of the rover's instruments - the Microscopic Imager, the Alpha Particle X-Ray Spectrometer and the Panoramic Camera's filters - researchers determined the deposit to be hydrated calcium sulfate, or gypsum, a mineral that does not occur except in the presence of water. This discovery was called "slam dunk" evidence that "water flowed through underground fractures in the rock."

It moved to terrain that positioned it about 15 degrees to the north, an angle more favorable for solar energy production during the Martian winter.

2012

Greeley Haven

In January 2012 the rover returned data from Greeley Haven, named after the geologist Ronald Greeley, while enduring its fifth Martian winter. It studied the Martian wind, which has been described as "the most active process on Mars today", and conducted a radio science experiment. By carefully measuring radio signals, wobbles in Martian rotation may show whether the planet has a solid or liquid interior. The winter worksite sits on the Cape York segment of the rim of Endeavour Crater. Opportunity reached the edge of this  crater in August after three years of driving from smaller Victoria Crater, which it studied for two years.

By March (around Sol 2890), 'Amboy' rock was studied with the MIMOS II Mössbauer spectrometer and the Microscopic Imager, and the amount of Argon gas in the Martian air was measured. The Mars winter solstice passed on March 30, 2012 (Sol 2909) and on April 1 there was a small cleaning event. On Sol 2913 (April 3, 2012) solar array energy production was 321 watt-hours.

The mission of Mars rover Opportunity continued, and by May 1, 2012 (Sol 2940), energy production had increased to 365 watt-hours, with the solar array dust factor at 0.534. The team prepared the rover for movement and finished up collecting data on Amboy rock. 60 Doppler radio passes were completed over the winter.

On May 8, 2012 (Sol 2947), the rover moved . On that day the Solar energy production was 357 watt-hours with a solar array dust factor of 0.536. Opportunity had been stationary on Greeley Haven for 130 Sols (Mars' days), with a 15 degrees tilt to the North to help survive the winter; after the drive the northerly tilt decreased to 8 degrees. The drive marked the end of the geodynamics science experiment, which used radio Doppler measurements while the rover was stationary. By June 2012, it studied Mars dust and a nearby rock vein christened "Monte Cristo" as it headed North.

Exploring Matijevic hill at Cape York
On July 2, 2012 Opportunitys 3000 Sols on Mars were celebrated. 
By July 5, 2012, NASA published a new panorama (seen below) showing the surroundings of Opportunity at the Greeley Haven position at Cape York. Also, the other end of the Endeavour crater is seen in the right half of the scene, a crater that spans  in diameter. That month, Mars Reconnaissance Orbiter spotted a dust storm and water ice clouds near the rover.

Before Curiosity landed on August 6, 2012, Opportunity sent special Ultra High Frequency radio signals to simulate Curiosity for a radio observatory in Australia. August activities for Opportunity included collecting data on atmospheric opacity, visiting Sao Rafael and Berrio craters, and achieving  of driving on Sol 3056 (August 28, 2012). Also, on August 19, 2012 Mars Express orbiter automatically exchanged data with both Curiosity  and Opportunity in one orbit, its first double contact.

In the fall Opportunity headed south, exploring Matijevic hill and searching for phyllosilicate minerals. Some data was sent to Earth directly using X-Band radio signals, as opposed to orbiter relays. Finally, the number of power cycles on the rover's Inertial Measurement Unit were reduced. Science work included testing various hypotheses about the newly discovered spherules.

2013

Leaving Cape York
 
After completing work at Matijevic Hill the Opportunity rover headed south to the rim of Endeavour Crater. Next, the rover headed south across a gap in the rim to a place the researchers called Botany Bay, then up onto the next rim segment to the south. There are two hills to the south of it, one called Solander Point and farther south is Cape Tribulation. The current aim is for Opportunity to reach Solander Point before winter reaches the Martian southern hemisphere as the area has ground tilted to the north allowing the rover to stay active during the winter months. In addition Solander Point has a large geological stack for Opportunity to explore.
In April 2013, the rover passed through a three-week-long solar conjunction, when communication with Earth was blocked because of the Sun. The rover arm was positioned on a rock during that time so the APXS could collect data.

On May 16, 2013, NASA announced that Opportunity had driven further than any other NASA vehicle on a world other than Earth. After Opportunitys total odometry went over  it surpassed the total distance driven by the Apollo 17 Lunar Roving Vehicle. The record for longest distance driven by a vehicle on another world was as of 2013 held by the Lunokhod 2 lunar rover. Based on wheel rotations Lunokhod 2 was thought to have covered , but Russian scientists have revised that to an estimated distance of about  based on orbital images of the lunar surface.

On May 17, 2013, NASA announced that a preliminary analysis of one of the rock targets, named "Esperance", suggested that water in the past may have had a neutral pH. This was later confirmed in further studies, supporting the notion that ancient Mars was a "water-rich world with conditions amenable for life". June 21, 2013 marked five Martian years on the 'red planet'. The project manager, noting the harsh conditions of the planet, has said each day is "a gift".

Solander Point

By early July 2013 Opportunity was approaching Solander Point, with daily drives ranging from dozens of meters (yards) to over a hundred. It arrived at its base in early August 2013, after investigating a curious terrain patch along the way. Solander could provide a northward facing slope to aid in sunlight collection, as the Martian winter was approaching (as the season changes, the angle of the Sun is shifting). On Sol 3390 (August 6, 2013) energy intake was 385 watt-hours, down from 395 on Sol 3384 (July 31, 2013), and 431 on Sol 3376 (July 23, 2013). In May 2013 it had been as high as 546 watt-hours. Other factors that impact collection include the atmospheric opacity (i.e. "Tau") and "solar array dust factor"dust that collects on the panels. Although the rover cannot clean the dust off, such systems were considered for the rover during its development.

In September, numerous surface targets and rocks around Solander were examined by the rover. Solar array energy production dropped to 346 watt-hours by Sol 3430 (September 16, 2013), and 325 watt-hours by Sol 3452 (October 9, 2013). By traveling to locations with favorable tilt, dubbed "lily pads", Opportunity managed to receive over about 300 watt-hours per day even as the heart of the Mars winter approached. The Martian winter minimum was predicted for February 2014, but by making use of the northward slopes the rover had enough power to remain mobile during the Martian winter. By the end of October the rover was climbing up Solander point, where it was hoped some of the oldest rocks yet seen would be examined. The rocks were believed to date to Mars's Noachian Period about four billion years ago, and could have provided some science surprises by Christmas. The team was hunting for "juicy" slopes of 5 to 20 degrees for more power.

As it ascended, it doglegged in early November to avoid an area of dusty ripples. It continued to collect data on Martian rocks and dust in the area. Energy production from the Sun on that date was 311 watt-hours, with Tau at 0.536 and the dust factor at 0.491.

Before Spirit rover stopped responding in 2010, it reported 134 watt-hours as temperatures plunged below minus 41.5 degrees Celsius (minus 42.7 degrees Fahrenheit).

By early December power levels had hit 270 watt-hours per day, even as it climbed higher up the ridge. It maintained a northerly tilt to increase energy production on Solander point. In early December one of the communication relay satellites at Mars, Odyssey, had some difficulties so the rover sent its telemetry directly to Earth. The orbiter returned to operation after December 10, 2013, and the rover prepared for additional drives. On Sol 3521 (Dec. 19, 2013) the rover took micro-images and used the Alpha Particle X-ray Spectrometer. Between December 31 and New Year's Day cleaning events removed dust, improving the Solar Array Dust Factor to 0.566 (where higher is better and 1.0 is totally clean). Energy production increased 35 watt-hours/day after this cleaning, to 371 watt-hours/day.

2014

Opportunity started off 2014 on the western ridge of Endeavour crater, providing elevated panoramas of the surrounding region. Research on data from Mars orbiters identified interesting minerals on the outcrop. Some communication and difficulties the previous month delayed investigating these rocks, but on the positive side, the wait, along with a cleaning event over January 1, allowed for more electrical power to be available. The rover is tilted towards the Sun to help it get more power, and it is expected that it can remain active during the Martian winter.

Pinnacle Island 

On January 17, NASA reported that a rock, named "Pinnacle Island", that was not in a rover image taken on Sol 3528, "mysteriously" appeared 13 days later in a similar image taken on Sol 3540. One possible explanation, presented by Steven Squyres, principal investigator of the Mars Exploration Rover Mission, was that the rover, in one of its turning motions, flicked the rock from a few meters away and into the new location.

In response, Rhawn Joseph published an article in the fringe journal Journal of Cosmology on January 17, 2014, and filed a writ of mandamus on January 27, 2014, in San Francisco Federal Court, stating that the object is a living entity and demanded that NASA re-examine the rock more closely. However, NASA already had examined the rock with the rover's microscope and analyzers, and confirmed it was a rock with a high sulphur, manganese, and magnesium content. According to Steven Squyres, "We have looked at it with our microscope. It is clearly a rock." On February 14, 2014, NASA released an image showing the location from where the "Pinnacle Island" rock was dislodged by the Opportunity rover.

Renewed focus 
On January 23, 2014, NASA celebrated the tenth anniversary (officially, January 25, 2014) of the rover's landing on Mars by sharing a self-portrait of the rover from above. They also reported on the latest discoveries of some Martian rocks and stated, "These rocks are older than any we examined earlier in the mission, and they reveal more favorable conditions for microbial life than any evidence previously examined by investigations with Opportunity."

On January 24, 2014, NASA reported that current studies on the planet Mars by the Curiosity and Opportunity rovers will now be searching for evidence of ancient life, including a biosphere based on autotrophic, chemotrophic and/or chemolithoautotrophic microorganisms, as well as ancient water, including fluvio-lacustrine environments (plains related to ancient rivers or lakes) that may have been habitable. The search for evidence of habitability, taphonomy (related to fossils), and organic carbon on the planet Mars is now a primary NASA objective.

Among many activities in March 2014, the rover studied the rock "Augustine," and on Sol 3602 (March 12, 2014), produced 498 watt-hours from sunlight. Two cleaning events in March 2014 significantly boosted available power.  Since January 2013, the solar array dust factor (one of the determinants of solar power production) varied from a relatively dusty 0.467 on December 5, 2013 (sol 3507) to a relatively clean 0.964 on May 13, 2014 (sol 3662).

After a series of "resets" pointed to problems with flash memory, the rover stopped driving from late August to early September, 2014, in order to reformat its flash memory.  Though minor memory problems persisted in the immediate aftermath of reformatting, they did not hinder the rover's continued operation; Opportunity resumed driving towards "Ulysses" crater and "Marathon Valley," exceeding total odometry of 41 kilometers by November 11, 2014.

2015 
2015 was a year of superlative achievements for the MER-B mission, starting off with summiting Cape Tribulation in January 2015, which was the highest elevation achieved yet on its mission. Then in March 2016 it accomplished the distance of a classic marathon. Also in March 2016 it achieved the steepest slope traverse (32 degree) yet of its mission, surpassing the slope it took on at Burns Cliff in 2004. MER-B was trying to reach a target on Knudsen Ridge, on the south side of Marathon Valley, which meant attempting a steep grade which can cause wheel slippage.  Another effect of this angle was that sand and dust that had collected on the rover flowed in streaks over the back of the rover, such was the incline.

In 2015 MER-B entered Marathon Valley and would study it until September 2016.

On March 23, 2015, NASA reported Opportunity flash memory was successfully reformatted. After completing analysis of the flash memory issues, engineers concluded that some of the problems stemmed from a single memory bank, one of  Opportunity seven "banks" of onboard flash memory. A software upgrade was sent which allows the rover to bypass this bank, known as Bank 7.  By February 2015, total odometry exceeded 42 kilometers. From July to September, the rover mostly operated using a RAM-only mode, to avoid ongoing flash memory issues. In September, a series of tests were performed to better understand the volatility of the device.

During the beginning of October 2015, Opportunity began its drive to northly-tilted slopes in Marathon Valley of the west rim of Endeavour crater in preparation for the Martian winter. By November 2, after attempting to use the rover's flash memory, Opportunity again suffered an "amnesia" event. and the decision was made to switch back to use RAM on November 11 (Sol 4195).

2016 
On January 3, 2016 (Sol 4246), Opportunity went through the winter solstice on Mars with already improved solar insolation, with the rover producing 449 watt-hours from its solar panels. On January 25, 2016, Opportunity had marked twelve years since landing on Mars and continued its scientific investigation of Marathon Valley.

On March 31, 2016, Opportunity captured an image of a dust devil inside Endeavour crater.  Although the Spirit rover saw dust devils frequently, they have been less common in the area that Opportunity is exploring.

Marathon Valley Panorama
In June 2016, MER-B took a special panoramic image called the Sacagawea Panorama in honor of Sacagawea, the Lemhi Shoshone woman that helped the Lewis and Clark Expedition on their journey of exploration across America in 1804 to 1806. The image was taken of Marathon Valley at Endeavour Crater on the planet Mars.

On the right side of this image is "Knudsen Ridge", and beyond Marathon valley is the floor of Endeavor crater. In the distance is the rim of crater on the other side.

Marathon Valley departure
In September 2016, Opportunity departed from Marathon Valley which it traversed through over the previous Earth year. As it continued to explore the Western rim of Endeavor crater, it was directed out of Lewis and Clark gap in Marathon valley, and made its way towards Spirit mound. By early October 2016, the rover had reached Spirit mound by passing through Bitterroot valley, where it began to collect data on a science target.

Starting in October 2016, the three new mission goals include driving down into Endeavour Crater along what is thought to be a water-carved gully, compare the material on the plains to the interior of the crater, and to find pre-impact rocks (rocks that pre-date the impact that presumably formed Endeavour crater).

By October 4, 2016, the rover had traveled , and generated 472 watt-hours of electricity. This date was mission time of Sol (Mars days) 4514.

The gully in the above annotated picture is a few hundred meters from the rover, and is the location of the suspected fluid-carved, possibly water, gullies that have never been investigated from the surface before. One of the MER-B goals is to drive down to this gully and examine it.

Imaging Schiaparellis descent
In October 2016 the ESA Schiaparelli lander attempted to land near Endeavour crater, and the two teams worked together for Opportunity to possibly image the lander during its descent. Opportunity did take pictures of the area of the sky the lander was coming down in although the lander was not identified at that time; the nature of MER-B's cameras, the terrain, and the uncertainty of the lander's location, meant imaging was not a certainty. By late October 2016 it was confirmed Schiaparelli had crashed into the surface rather than achieving a soft touchdown.

Moving on
The rover headed south from Spirit point after the events of ExoMars, continuing its mission on the edge of Endeavour crater. On Sol 4541 (Nov. 1, 2016), the solar array energy production is 390 watt-hours and on Sol 4548 (Nov. 8, 2016), the solar array energy production is 445 watt-hours. A readout from the EEPROM was returned to Earth, this is used in the test-bed rovers on Earth.

2017
On Sol 4623 (January 24, 2017 PST) the team celebrated 13 years operating Opportunity on the surface of Mars. By February 7, 2017 (Sol 4636) the rover had traveled  on the surface of Mars. Power collection from the Sun on that date was 414 watt-hours. The long-term goal at the time was a gully south of the rover on the Western rim of Endeavour crater. Science operations also continued including microscopic imaging of select rocks, APXS operation, and atmospheric argon gas measurements.

Throughout 2017, Opportunity worked its way south along the Western rim as it moved towards the gully, which the team named Perseverance Valley in April 2017. Some other names considered for this feature were Perseverance Gulch, Perseverance Ravine, and Perseverance Gorge. It is a valley network that runs downslope in the Cape Bryon section of Western rim of Endeavour crater.

The Martian winter reached its hardest time for the rover this year, with reduced sunlight and colder temperatures. One strategy the Rover team uses is to position the Rover on northward faced slopes to get more sunlight, and because the gully runs east–west, they were often able to use the southern edge of the gully channel of Perseverance Valley to tilt the rover this way. The Martian winter solstice was in November 2017, and it is the 8th one that MER-B has passed through.

Some energy production readings from 2017:

Up to 4836 (September 2017)
Rover arrives at the Gully (Perseverance Valley) and heads into it, taking measurements and pictures, but also had to survive the Mars winter (November Winter Solstice).

2018
In 2018 the rover continued to explore the area called Perseverance Valley, which is on the western rim of Endeavor Crater. The feature was previously called "Gully" and it was named by the rover team in early 2017. The rover reached Perseverance Valley (the gully) in 2017 and spent the rest of the year exploring this area. In 2018 this in-depth study continued.

The Valley may have a previously unknown type of rock. It is thought to be a fluid-carved channel, a spillway from the surrounding planes down to the crater floor. Among the candidates for what carved the channels are water, but also ice or wind currents. One of the ongoing questions is the idea of ancient water on Mars, and how it may have impacted the modern Mars environment. In the 2010s NASA has been on the hunt for ancient fossils left by tiny living organisms especially when they make large colonies, such as Stromatolites, which look like mushroom shaped rocks but are made by colonies of bacteria. The question of ancient bacteria on Mars was raised in the 1990s, when a scientist thought he had found microscopic bacterial fossils on a meteorite that came from Mars (see ALH84001) but was found on Earth. Future missions, such as Mars 2020, will carry more advanced chemical and geological detectors to Mars with them; some images taken by Opportunity have led to speculation about whether the images contain evidence of extraterrestrial life. One example, as reported by National Geographic, appears to show a cauliflower-shaped rock in an image taken by the Spirit rover in 2007, which, to some scientists, resembled fossils of microscopic stromatolites, which are ubiquitous on Earth, and represent the earliest widely accepted example of life in Earth's biosphere. Stromatolites, thought to be signs of some of the earliest life discovered on Earth, almost 4 billion years ago, are on Earth today. Another candidate are cynobacteria which are also determined to be among the oldest life on Earth. Because of the large impacts that eject matter into space Mars has exchanged material with over long time scales, leading some to suggest life could make the journey between Earth and Mars. Indeed, cynobacteria survived for almost two-years in space (Aboard ISS) and could still come alive again when put in life conditions after being in zero-g, zero-air, high radiation conditions common to outer space. On the colonization side, cyanobacteria like nostoc colonies that have been studied for terraforming are known to survive on Mars regolith simulant and lower pressures. Some the evidence for ancient water include the discovery of minerals that form in the presence of water, such as Jarosite, discovered by Opportunity at Eagle Crater in 2004. (see also Martian spherules)

Opportunity studied the rock target Jornada del Muerto in Perseverance Valley, using its surviving suite of instruments including the Microscopic Imager (MI), APXS, and the color cameras. At this time rocks from the Matijevic Formation have not been found, and the valley is proving to have some complicated natures One area being studied is how the dust flows through channel and makes deposits.

On Sol 4977 (Jan. 23, 2018), the stored backup flight software was updated to the latest version.

On Sol 4999 (Feb. 15, 2018) MER-B took a Pancam of the Martian sunrise.

5000 sols on Mars

On February 16, 2018, MER-B achieved 5000 sols (Martian Days) on Mars since landing on the planet in January 2004. At the time it was making its way down Perseverance Valley (aka the Gully) on the western rim of Endeavour crater, which it has been exploring in since 2011. The interior rim of the crater where Opportunity is exploring is sloped at about 15 to 20 degrees on average.

Sol 5,000 (Feb. 16, 2018)
On Sol 5000 the team used the rover to take a self-portrait including the Pancam mast, by using the microscopic imager on the end of the robotic arm.

Power production on Sol 5004 (Feb. 20, 2018) was 653 watt-hours.

Dust storm

In June 2018, a local dust storm began to develop near Opportunity. The first signs of the  distant storm were discovered on June 1, 2018, in photographs by the Mars Color Imager (MARCI) camera on the Mars Reconnaissance Orbiter (MRO). More weather reports from the MRO and the MARCI team indicated a prolonged storm. Although this was, at that time, still far away from the rover, it began to influence the atmospheric opacity at the rover's location.

Within days, the storm had spread globally. As a result, plans were developed on June 4 and 5 to prepare for the anticipated lower power supply. Since then, the atmosphere over the rover had worsened further. On June 3, the 5105th Sol, Opportunity solar panels still generated 468 watt-hours. The atmospheric opacity (called tau value) was about 1.0.

The power supply dropped to 345 watt hours on June 4 at a tau of 2.1. On June 6, only 133 watt hours were generated, the tau value was estimated at 3.0. Opportunity has not experienced such high tau levels since the last dust storm in 2007, which had an estimated tau value of 5.5. The 2018 storm had an estimated tau value of 10.8 on June 10 and the storm spanned an area of  - the approximate area of both North America and Russia combined.

The rover team made another plan, in which the rover gets only the latest commands at the first sol in the morning and sleeps until the next morning. The rover then wakes up in the afternoon to conduct atmospheric measurements with the Pancam and conduct a brief communication session with the MRO orbiter. However, scientific investigations were discontinued, and the rover entered continuous hibernation on June 12. Although Opportunity rover requires the power generated by solar panels to keep the central electrical components warm, it features a small radioisotope heater unit (RPU) that does not require sunlight to function, and the relatively warm summer weather was not expected to damage the electronic components at night. The winter cold is likely the reason that Opportunity twin rover Spirit stopped working in 2010.

Although such dust storms are not surprising, they rarely occur. They can arise within a short time and then persist for weeks to months. During the southern season of summer, the sunlight heats dust particles and brings them higher into the atmosphere. This creates wind, which in turn stirs up more dust. This results in a feedback loop that scientists are still trying to understand, so they are taking an opportunity to study this storm from orbit using the various visible and infrared instruments on the MRO orbiter.

As of June 10, 2018 the mission for Opportunity was able to extend its 92-day (Earth) mission to over 5250 days. Opportunity took its last image (of an overall total of 228,771 raw images) on June 10, 2018.

On June 12, 2018, Opportunity entered safe mode as evidenced by its lack of communication. A NASA teleconference about the dust storm was presented on June 13, 2018. Opportunity team implemented additional communication times from NASA's Deep Space Network to receive up-to-date data from Mars. An advantage of the dust storm is that the temperature differences are not as extreme as they are on the surface of Mars. In addition, the swirled-up dust absorbs heat, thereby increasing the ambient temperature at the location of Opportunity. NASA reported on June 20, 2018, that the dust storm had grown to completely cover the entire planet.

NASA stated they did not expect to resume communication until after the global dust storm subsided.

After the storm
At the beginning of September 2018, the atmospheric opacity (tau) over the rover site was estimated to be below 1.5. This started a 45-day window that was expected to be the best time to re-establish contact with the rover. After more than three months without contact, NASA expected Opportunity to have most of its timers in fault state. To take this into account, as of September 19, 2018, "sweep and beep" commands are sent throughout the available transmission time.

By early October, the storm subsided and the atmosphere cleared up, but the rover kept silent, suggesting either a catastrophic failure or a layer of dust covered its solar panels. By November 27, 2018, NASA had attempted to contact Opportunity 359 times. The team remained hopeful that a windy period between November 2018 and January 2019 would clear the dust from its solar panels, as had happened before.

2019
On February 12, 2019, NASA announced it made its final attempt to contact the rover before declaring the rover dead.

Sol milestones
Sol 3,000 (July 2, 2012)
Sol 4,000 (April 26, 2015)
Sol 5,000 (Feb. 16, 2018)
Sol 5,250 (June 10, 2018) – Contact lost.
Sol 5,352 (Feb 12, 2019) – Mission officially declared dead.

Craters, rocks, etc.

Some of the craters MER-B has investigated
Burn's Cliff
Victoria crater, 2006–9, 800 meters (half a mile) across.
Cape Verde
Endeavour crater, since 2011, 
Cape York
Solander Point, 2013
Cape Tribulation
Marathon Valley, 2015-2016 
Perseverance Valley (aka the Gully), 2017-2018

Rocks

Some excitement from finding meteorites, new types of rock or signatures detected from orbit, and speculations on ancient alien fossils which as of yet lean towards geological processes.

Examples
 Block Island
 Bounce Rock
 El Capitan
 Heat Shield Rock (formally the Meridiani Planum meteorite)
 Last Chance
 Mackinac Island
 Oileán Ruaidh
 Shelter Island
Jelly Doughnut (aka Pinnacle Island)

Some other famous targets are the "blueberries" (2004) and "newberries", aka Kirkwood spheres (2012)

See also List of rocks on Mars#Opportunity and List of surface features of Mars imaged by Opportunity

See also

 Curiosity rover timeline
 InSight
 Mars Express
 Perseverance rover timeline
 Sojourner rover timeline
 Spirit rover timeline

References

External links

 NASA/JPL Mission page
 MER-B Gallery

+
Mars timelines
Spaceflight timelines
Exploration of Mars